Macklin Robinson (born April 2, 1994) is an American soccer player who plays as a goalkeeper for AC Syracuse Pulse.

Career
Robinson played two years of college soccer at Ohio Dominican University between 2012 and 2013, before transferring to DePaul University, where he played in 2014 and 2015.

On April 27, 2016, Robinson signed with North American Soccer League side Carolina RailHawks.

Robinson was loaned to United Soccer League club Pittsburgh Riverhounds on June 30, 2017.

On 6 February 2019, Robinson signed with the Tampa Bay Rowdies of the USL Championship.

References

External links

NISA profile

1994 births
Living people
AC Syracuse Pulse players
American soccer players
Association football goalkeepers
DePaul Blue Demons men's soccer players
National Premier Soccer League players
New York Cosmos players
North Carolina FC players
Ohio Dominican Panthers men's soccer players
Pittsburgh Riverhounds SC players
Tampa Bay Rowdies players
Soccer players from Cincinnati
USL Championship players
National Independent Soccer Association players